Kulosaari Manor is a manor house and mansion located near the Kulosaari neighbourhood of Helsinki.

The manor was designed in the neoclassical style by architect Pehr Granstedt in 1815. Its first owners were the noble :fi:Jägerhorn af Storby family.

The current main building may be partly based on an earlier 18th-century house commissioned by Count Augustin Ehrensvärd. The history of the actual manor (rather than the manor house itself) dates even further back to the 16th-century, its earliest known owner having been Erik Filpusson, from 1540 to 1587.

The manor has been owned by the City of Helsinki since 1927.  It is currently (until 2020) leased to JHL, the Trade Union for Public and Welfare Sectors, and mainly used for their and their members' events and recreational purposes.

Notes

References 

 https://www.hel.fi/static/liitteet/kaupunkiymparisto/julkaisut/julkaisut/julkaisu-31-19.pdf

External links 
Website of the local chapter of JHL, the manor's current tenants (in Finnish)

Kulosaari
Buildings and structures in Helsinki
Manor houses in Finland
Houses completed in 1810